Scioto Township may refer to:

 Scioto Township, Delaware County, Ohio
 Scioto Township, Jackson County, Ohio
 Scioto Township, Pickaway County, Ohio
 Scioto Township, Pike County, Ohio
 Scioto Township, Ross County, Ohio

Township name disambiguation pages